Eutetrapha cinnabarina is a species of beetle in the family Cerambycidae. It was described by Pu in 1986.

References

Saperdini
Beetles described in 1986